Dataminr is an artificial intelligence company. The company’s private sector product, Dataminr Pulse, is used by corporations to monitor real-time events, and to aid with crisis response by providing playbooks, messaging tools and post-event documentation. Dataminr's First Alert technology is used by first responders, such as those helping to provide aid during natural disasters and other emergency events. 

Dataminr employs around 800 people and is headquartered in New York. The company has offices in New York City, Washington, D.C., Bozeman, and Seattle, as well as London, England, Dublin, Ireland,  Melbourne, Australia, and Copenhagen, Denmark.

History 
Dataminr was founded in 2009 by Yale University graduates Ted Bailey, Sam Hendel and Jeff Kinsey. Dataminr came to wider notice when it issued an alert that Osama bin Laden had been killed 23 minutes faster than major news organizations.

In 2014, Datamnr entered into a partnership with CNN and Twitter, resulting in Dataminr for News, a tool to "alert journalists to information that’s emerging on Twitter in real time."

On December 30, 2019, Dataminr claimed to have detected the first signals of the COVID-19 outbreak within public social media posts. The company went on to detect clusters indicating future spikes in 14 different US states. Seven days later, all 14 states were hit hard by the coronavirus. Dataminr partnered with the UN in May 2019 to equip thousands of UN personnel with Dataminr’s First Alert product for the public sector.

Dataminr's social media intelligence contract for the FBI was taken over by Zerofox at the end of 2020.

On the morning of January 5, 2021, Dataminr warned Capitol security officials of troubling online public chatter that would soon become the January 6 riot.

In July 2021, Dataminr conducted its first M&A transaction when it acquired WatchKeeper, a UK-based geovisualization platform. In the acquisition, Dataminr combined WatchKeeper’s geovisualized data layers with its Pulse platform to provide context around events. A few months later, in October 2021, Dataminr acquired Krizo, a real-time crisis response platform based in Copenhagen, Denmark. 

The company ranked #5 on the Forbes AI 50 List in 2019 and was the winner of an 2019 AI Breakthrough Award for Best Overall AI Solution. In 2020, Dataminr was named to Forbes Cloud 100, and Deloitte Technology Fast 500, ‘Most Innovative Use of AI’ at the 2020 AI & Machine Learning Awards.

In 2020, Dataminr’s AI team had published several papers including, “Unsupervised Detection of Sub-Events in Large Scale Disasters,” for the Association for the Advancement of Artificial Intelligence quarterly journal; “Multimodal Categorization of Crisis Events in Social Media,” for Computer Vision and Pattern Recognition 2020; “Clustering of Social Media Messages for Humanitarian Aid Response during Crisis,” for AI for Social Good, and “The ApposCorpus: A new multilingual, multi-domain dataset for factual appositive generation,” for COLING 2020.

In late 2021, the company announced the appointment of Cristina Bita to its board of directors and as chairwoman of the audit committee.

Controversies 
In 2020, The Intercept released a report that police departments used Dataminr services for surveillance during the George Floyd protests, including accessing social media posts about protest locations and actions. As written in the article, "The monitoring seems at odds with claims from both Twitter and Dataminr that neither company would engage in or facilitate domestic surveillance following a string of 2016 controversies." Twitter claimed that the company was just "news alerting." In response to the article, Dataminr clarified that "First Alert identifies breaking news events without any regard to the racial or ethnic composition of an area where a breaking news event occurs. … Race, ethnicity, or any other demographic characteristic of the people posting public social media posts about events is never part of determining whether a breaking news alert is sent to First Alert clients." It also said that "First Alert does not enable any type of geospatial analysis. First Alert provides no feature or function that allows a user to analyze the locations of specific social media posts, social media users or plot social media posts on a map."

References 

Companies based in New York City
American companies established in 2009
2009 establishments in New York City